Jean Marie Joseph Magrou (October 22, 1869 – 1945) was a French sculptor, born in Béziers, France.  He studied under Eugène Émile Thomas and Injalbert.

Magrou was a Chevalier of the Legion of Honour.

He is remembered, among things for his statues of Pedro II of Brazil, in Brazil.

References

1869 births
1945 deaths
People from Béziers
20th-century French sculptors
19th-century French sculptors
French male sculptors
Academic staff of the University of Paris
École des Beaux-Arts alumni
Chevaliers of the Légion d'honneur
19th-century French male artists